The Su'ao Fortress is a former fort in Su'ao Township, Yilan County, Taiwan.

History
In 1889, the French Empire attempted to invade Taiwan in Su'ao. The Qing Dynasty decided to build coastal forts and barracks to defend the area from the French.

Architecture
The fort was built at an altitude of 200 meters.

Transportation
The fort is accessible within walking distance east of Su'ao Station of Taiwan Railways.

See also
 List of tourist attractions in Taiwan

References

1889 establishments in Taiwan
Buildings and structures in Yilan County, Taiwan
Forts in Taiwan
Military installations established in 1889
Tourist attractions in Yilan County, Taiwan